Grewia hirsuta is an Asian species of flowering plant in the mallow family, Malvaceae.

References

hirsuta
Flora of Asia